Theneer Viduthi is a 2011 Indian Tamil-language romantic drama film directed by music composer S. S. Kumaran and starring Adith Arun and Reshmi Menon.

Plot 
A hardworking man in the day, Kumaran (Adith Arun), turns a drunkard by night. He introduces himself as a marriage decorator and falls in love with Valli (Reshmi Menon). Her father (Prabhakar) is a petty (snack) shop owner and a pious man who dislikes drunkards. How Kumaran and Valli fall in love with the approval of Valli's father forms the rest of the story.

Cast 
 Adith Arun as Kumaran
 Reshmi Menon as Valli
 Prabhakar as Valli's father
 Kodumudi as Kumaran's brother
 Swetha
Ravivarma
Theni SN Madhavan

Production 
Music director S. S. Kumaran made his directorial debut with this film. Adith Arun and  Reshmi Menon, who previously starred in Inidhu Inidhu together, collaborate again for this film.  The film is a romantic story with no violence. After screening the film to a select group of people, the film was trimmed based on their feedback. Kumaran wanted M. S. Bhaskar to portray the heroine's father, but he was replaced by Prabhakar, an associate of Sasi, due to the film's low budget. Kumaran had previously collaborated with Sasi in Poo. Adith Arun practiced his Tamil and dubbed for his character in the film.

Soundtrack 
The music was composed by S. S. Kumaran, who became a playback singer for this film.

Release and reception
The film released on July 1, 2011. Indiaglitz wrote "Due credit should be given to Kumaran for avoiding commercial cliches as he ensures that he gives a simple movie. There are some lagging moments but considering this to be Kumaran's maiden venture, they can be over-looked." Behindwoods wrote "The consoling factors in this otherwise bland fare are the soothing lush locations and the picturization of few songs. It would have been positive for the film if S S Kumaran had paid the same diligence that he paid to the songs to the main story as well. In short Theneer Viduthi fails to impress."

References 

2011 romantic comedy-drama films
2011 films
2011 directorial debut films
Indian romantic comedy-drama films